Nezha, stylized on some posters as 'NeZha' or 'Ne Zha', is a 2014 Chinese period drama film directed by Li Xiaofeng, in his directorial debut.

The film is based on a novella by Lü Yao, and it was released in China on July 11, 2015. Its title refers to the Chinese folk deity of the same name.

Cast 

 Li Jiaqi as Wang Xiaobing
 Li Haofei as Li Xiaolu
 Chen Jin as Xu Wanqing
 Wang Yong as Wang Yinghua
 Xin Peng as Xu Jie
 Li Huan as Li Danyang
 Chen Yongjian as Lin
 Ding Pei

Release 

The film had its world premiere on October 5, 2014, in the New Currents section of the 19th Busan International Film Festival, and was then played in several other festivals, including, on November 16, 2014, in the Golden Horse Film Festival in Taiwan. It went on general release in China on July 11, 2015.

Reception

Box office 

The film earned  at the Chinese box office.

Critical response 

Derek Elley of Film Business Asia gave the film a 5 out of 10, saying that a "promising story of a female rebel and her bosom pal squanders its early promise."

References

External links
 

2014 drama films
Chinese drama films
2014 directorial debut films
Films based on short fiction
Films based on Chinese novels
Films set in the 1990s